A Bosniak republic, or "Bosniak entity", was proposed during the Bosnian War when plans for the partition of Bosnia and Herzegovina were made.  It would either be established as one of three ethnic states in a loose confederation, or as an independent "Muslim state" in the area controlled by the Bosnian Army, as proposed by Islamists. Thus, the Bosniak-inhabited territories or Bosnian Army-controlled area (the Republic of Bosnia and Herzegovina) would become a Bosniak state, as Republika Srpska was for the Bosnian Serbs and Herzeg-Bosnia for the Bosnian Croats. The failed 1992 Serb–Croat Graz agreement would see a small Bosniak buffer state, pejoratively called "Alija's Pashaluk" on a map displayed during the discussions. The Owen-Stoltenberg plan (July 1993) would give Bosniaks 30% of territory, including ca. 65% of the Bosniak population (according to the 1991 census). In February 1994, the Party of Democratic Action (SDA) proposed a Bosniak state in which Serbs and Croats would be national minorities. The Dayton Agreement (November–December 1995) ended the war and created the federal republic of Bosnia and Herzegovina (BiH), made up of two entities, the Bosniak and Croat-inhabited Federation of Bosnia and Herzegovina (FBiH), and the Serb-inhabited Republika Srpska (RS). As noted by international relations expert Niels van Willigen: "Whereas the Bosnian Croats and Bosnian Serbs could identify themselves with Croatia or Serbia respectively, the absence of a Bosniak state made the Bosniaks firmly committed to Bosnia as a single political entity."

Propaganda texts appeared in 1996, after the war, calling for a Bosniak state. Secular Bosniaks have warned that a partition of the state could lead to a rise in Islamic fundamentalism. 



See also
Zulfikarpašić–Karadžić agreement
Partition of Bosnia and Herzegovina
Peace plans proposed before and during the Bosnian War
Proposed secession of Republika Srpska

References

Sources

Further reading

Political history of Bosnia and Herzegovina
Partition (politics)
Bosniak history
Bosnian War
Separatism in Bosnia and Herzegovina